Dale Fowler is an American politician who has served as a Republican member of the Illinois Senate since January 2017. Fowler represents the 59th district, which includes all of Franklin, Hamilton, Williamson, Saline, Gallatin, Hardin, Pope, Massac, Johnson, Pulaski, and Alexander counties and portions of Union and Jackson counties in Southern Illinois. Prior to his election to the Illinois Senate he was mayor of Harrisburg and a member of the Saline County Board. Fowler defeated incumbent Gary Forby (D), who had represented the district for 14 years. He has 2 children with his wife Jill Fowler. Fowler is a Presbyterian.

In 2018, Democrat J.B. Pritzker appointed Fowler a member of the gubernatorial transition's Job Creation and Economic Opportunity Committee.

Fowler currently serves on the following committees: Commerce (Minority Spokesperson); Higher Education (Minority Spokesperson); Education; Energy and Public Utilities; Transportation; Revenue; Redistricting- Southern Illinois.

References

External links
 Profile at Illinois General Assembly website.

Living people
Year of birth missing (living people)
People from Eldorado, Illinois
Republican Party Illinois state senators
People from Harrisburg, Illinois
County board members in Illinois
21st-century American politicians